The Leinster Senior League is an association football league organised by the Leinster Football Association. In 2015–16 the Leinster Senior League operated twenty divisions. It also organises various cup competitions. Its Senior Division is a third level division in the Republic of Ireland football league system. Leinster Senior League teams also compete in the Leinster Senior Cup, the FAI Cup, the FAI Intermediate Cup and the FAI Junior Cup. In recent seasons the winners of the Senior Division have also qualified to play in the League of Ireland Cup. The vast majority of its member clubs are based in the Greater Dublin Area.

History

Foundation
Within a few seasons of the Leinster Football Association having been formed in 1892, the Leinster Senior League was established. Ciarán Priestley highlights a printed notice in the 4 September 1894 edition of The Irish Times. Under the headline "Leinster Football League"  there is a report of "a general meeting of the league... held the other evening at 27 D'Olier Street". Priestley also lists Bohemians, Britannia, Dublin University, Leinster Nomads, Phoenix and Montpelier as participants in the first season. The Leinster Senior League website states it was established in 1896.  However other sources suggest the league started a little later and was first played for in 1897–98 and that an unidentified British Army regimental team were the inaugural winners while Shelbourne were runners up.

League pyramid 
There is currently no promotion or relegation system between the League of Ireland First Division (Level 2) and the provincial leagues (Level 3) in place.

2016–17 Senior divisions

Junior leagues

Representative team
A Leinster Senior League representative team competes in the FAI Intermediate Interprovincial Tournament against teams representing the Ulster Senior League, the Munster Senior League and Connacht.

Notes

References

 
1896 establishments in Ireland
Sports leagues established in 1896